This is a list of state highways in Assam, India.

References

External links
Assam roads

State highways
Assam
State highways
Assam